Richard Výborný (born 4 June 1971) is a Czech table tennis player. He competed in the men's doubles event at the 2004 Summer Olympics.

References

1971 births
Living people
Czech male table tennis players
Olympic table tennis players of the Czech Republic
Table tennis players at the 2004 Summer Olympics
Sportspeople from Chomutov